Master Plan, Masterplan or The Master Plan may refer to:

General usage
Master Plan East or Generalplan Ost, a 1941–1945 Nazi plan for genocide and ethnic cleansing in Central and Eastern Europe
Master Plan Neighborhood areas in Detroit, urban planning divisions in Detroit, Michigan, US
California Master Plan for Higher Education, a 1960 postsecondary education plan
Comprehensive planning in urban planning
Strategic planning in business
Providentialism in religion
Strategy

Film and television
The Master Plan (1954 film), a British film by Cy Endfield
The Master Plan (2021 film), a Japanese film
"The Master Plan" (Parks and Recreation), a television episode
"The Master Plan" (Stingray), a television episode

Music
Masterplan (band), a German power metal band

Albums
Master Plan (album), by Dave Weckl, or the title song, 1990
Masterplan (Masterplan album), 2003
Masterplan (Stefanie Heinzmann album) or the title song, 2008
The Master Plan (Chris Brooks album) or the title song, 2002
The Master Plan (Dream Warriors album) or the title song, 1996
The Masterplan (album), by Oasis, or the 1995 title song (see below), 1998
The Master Plan, by In Essence, 2003
The Master Plan, by Tamela Mann, or the title song, 2009

Songs
"Masterplan" (song), by Diesel, 1993
"The Masterplan" (song), by Oasis, 1995
"Master Plan", by Adam Lambert from For Your Entertainment, 2009
"Master Plan" or "Who's the Man (With the Master Plan)", by the Kay Gees, 1984
"Master Plan", by My Morning Jacket from It Still Moves, 2003
"Masterplan", by the Plasmatics from Beyond the Valley of 1984, 1981
"The Masterplan", by Diana Brown & Barrie K. Sharpe, 1990

Other uses 
Master Plan, a 2012 board game by Brad Talton

See also
"Masterplanned", a song by Soulwax from From Deewee, 2017
Plan (disambiguation)